Big Sky is an American crime drama thriller series created by David E. Kelley and based on The Highway series of books by C. J. Box. The series premiered on ABC as a fall entry in the 2020–21 television season on November 17, 2020. In May 2021, the series was renewed for a second season which premiered on September 30, 2021. In May 2022, the series was renewed for a third season, subtitled Deadly Trails, which premiered on September 21, 2022.

Cast

Main

 Katheryn Winnick as Jenny Hoyt, an ex-cop who, despite being separated from her husband, still does freelance work for his agency; she later rejoins the Lewis and Clark County Sheriff's office as a deputy detective
 Kylie Bunbury as Cassie Dewell, a private detective who co-owns an agency called Dewell & Hoyt, which she initially runs with her romantic partner, Jenny's ex-husband Cody
 Brian Geraghty as Ronald Pergman (seasons 1–2), a long-haul trucker involved in several unsolved kidnappings
 Valerie Mahaffey as Helen Pergman (season 1), Ronald's mother
 Dedee Pfeiffer as Denise Brisbane, a  receptionist for the Dewell & Hoyt agency who helps Jenny and Cassie with background research
 Natalie Alyn Lind as Danielle Sullivan (season 1), Grace's older sister and one of Ronald Pergman's kidnapping victims
 Jesse James Keitel as Jerrie Kennedy (season 1, special guest star season 2), a transfeminine former sex worker and aspiring singer, who later works for Dewell & Hoyt detective agency, and was one of Ronald's victims. The role made Keitel one of the first nonbinary actors to play a nonbinary series regular on primetime television. 
 Jade Pettyjohn as Grace Sullivan (season 1), Danielle's younger sister, also kidnapped by Ronald 
 John Carroll Lynch as Rick Legarski (season 1), a Montana Highway Patrol officer with a shady past, who is revealed to be Ronald's accomplice
Lynch as Wolfgang "Wolf" Legarski (season 2), Rick's twin brother
 Ryan Phillippe as Cody Hoyt (season 1), a troubled former cop who runs a private detective agency with his partner Cassie
 Ted Levine as Horst Kleinsasser (season 1), a ruthless rancher who must pass the torch to his estranged children after suffering a stroke
 Anja Savcic as Scarlet Leyendecker (season 2; recurring season 1), girlfriend of Ronald Pergman after he changes his persona and takes the name "Arthur"
 Janina Gavankar as Ren Bhullar (season 2), daughter of a drug lord who oversees the cartel's expansion in Montana
 Logan Marshall-Green as Travis Stone (season 2), a former lover of Jenny's who is a sheriff's deputy working undercover with a local drug ring
 Omar Metwally as Mark Lindor (season 2; special guest star season 1), a Deputy U.S. Marshal who has an interest in the Ronald Pergman case
 Jamie-Lynn Sigler as Tonya Walsh (season 3; recurring season 2), a former waitress at a local diner whose boyfriend mysteriously disappears. She later became an associate in the Bhullar drug business, and is now a real estate agent of her own firm
 J. Anthony Pena as  Deputy Mo Poppernak (season 3; recurring season 2), Jenny's partner at the Lewis and Clark County sheriff's office
 Jensen Ackles as Beau Arlen (season 3; special guest star season 2), interim Sheriff of Lewis and Clark County following the shooting of Sheriff Tubb
 Reba McEntire as Sunny Barnes (season 3), a backcountry outfitter and the owner of Sunny Day Excursions

Special guest stars
 Darius Rucker as Possum (season 3)
 Lyle Lovett as Tex (season 3)

Recurring

 Brooke Smith as Merrilee Legarski (season 1), Rick's wife
 Gage Marsh as Justin Hoyt (season 1), Cody's and Jenny's son, whom Danielle and Grace were coming to visit when they were abducted
 Jeffrey Joseph as Joseph Dewell (seasons 1–2), Cassie's father and Kai's grandfather
 Gabriel Jacob-Cross as Kai Dewell (seasons 1–2), Cassie's son and Joseph's grandson
 Patrick Gallagher as Sheriff Walter Tubb, the sheriff of Lewis and Clark County
 Camille Sullivan as Joanie Sullivan (season 1), Danielle's and Grace's mother
 Chad Willett as Robert Sullivan (season 1), Danielle's and Grace's father
 Sharon Taylor as Commander Elena Sosa (season 1), twenty-year veteran of the Montana Highway Patrol and Rick Legarski's supervisor
 Zoë Noelle Baker as Phoebe Leyendecker (seasons 1–2), Scarlet's daughter
 Michael Raymond-James as Blake Kleinsasser (season 1), Horst's oldest son
 Britt Robertson as Cheyenne Kleinsasser (season 1), Horst's daughter
 Kyle Schmid as John Wayne "JW" Kleinsasser (season 1), Horst's second-born son
 Ryan Dorsey as Rand Kleinsasser (season 1), Horst's youngest son
 Michelle Forbes as Margaret Kleinsasser (season 1), Horst's wife
 Carlos Gómez as Gil Amaya (season 1), the Kleinsassers' former ranch manager
 Michelle Veintimilla as Rosie Amaya (season 1), Gil's daughter
 Sebastian Roché as Sheriff Wagy (season 1), the corrupt sheriff of Lochsa County
 Rachel Colwell as Angela (season 1), receptionist at the Lochsa County sheriff's office
 Arturo Del Puerto as T-Lock (season 2)
 Michael Malarkey as Deputy Harvey (season 2)
 T.V. Carpio as Rachel (season 2)
 Madelyn Kientz as Max (season 2)
 Jeremy Ray Taylor as Bridger (season 2)
 Troy Leigh-Anne Johnson as Harper (season 2)
 Lola Skye Reid as Madison (season 2)
 Romy Rosemont as Agatha (season 2)
 Ryan O'Nan as Donno (seasons 2–3), Ren's enforcer/ Tonya's business partner in season 3
 David Meunier as Dietrich (season 2)
 Vinny Chhibber as Jag Bhullar, Ren's brother (season 2)
 Jinder Mahal as Dhruv, Jag's enforcer (season 2)
 Constance Zimmer as Alicia (season 2)
 Bernard White as Veer Bhullar (season 2)
 Seth Gabel as Walter (season 3)
 Henry Ian Cusick as Avery (season 3)
 Rex Linn as  Buck Barnes (season 3), Sunny's husband
 Luke Mitchell as Cormac Barnes (season 3), Sunny and Buck's son
 Cree Cicchino as Emily Arlen (season 3), Beau's daughter
 Anirudh Pisharody as Luke (season 3)
 Madalyn Horcher as Paige (season 3)
 Rosanna Arquette  as Virginia "Gigi" Cessna (season 3), Jenny's mother who is a career criminal
 Angelique Cabral as Carla (season 3), Beau's ex-wife
 West Liang as Tony (season 3)

Episodes

Series overview

Season 1 (2020–21)

Season 2 (2021–22)

Season 3: Deadly Trails (2022–23)

Production

Development
The series, based on C. J. Box's novel The Highway and developed by David E. Kelley, was announced as The Big Sky in January 2020 and given a straight-to-series order by ABC. The series is produced by David E. Kelley Productions, A+E Studios and 20th Television. Kelley and Ross Fineman serve as executive producers, along with Box, Matthew Gross and Paul McGuigan. On June 17, 2020, it was announced that the series would air on Tuesdays at 10:00/9:00c. On December 7, 2020, ABC gave the series a six-episode back order, bringing the total number of first-season episodes ordered to 16. On May 4, 2021, ABC renewed the series for a second season. It was also reported that Elwood Reid who was added as an executive producer for the second half of the first season took the second season from Kelley. However, Kelley is still involved with the series and remains as an executive producer. On May 13, 2022, ABC renewed the series for a third season. The subtitle for the third season is Deadly Trails.

Casting
John Carroll Lynch, Dedee Pfeiffer, Ryan Phillippe, and Katheryn Winnick were the first cast additions announced through February 2020. In March 2020, Brian Geraghty, Kylie Bunbury, Natalie Alyn Lind and Jesse James Keitel were added, with Bunbury in the co-lead role. On June 24, 2020, it was announced that Jade Pettyjohn joined the cast in a starring role. On August 6, 2020, Valerie Mahaffey joined the main cast. On October 8, 2020, Brooke Smith, Jeffery Joseph, Gage Marsh, and Gabriel Jacob-Cross  were cast in recurring roles. in December 2020, Camille Sullivan, Chad Willett, Patrick Gallagher, and Sharon Taylor joined the cast in recurring capacities. In January 2021, Ted Levine was cast as a new series regular while Kyle Schmid, Michelle Forbes, Britt Robertson, Michael Raymond-James, Ryan Dorsey and Omar Metwally were cast in recurring roles. On April 12, 2021, Carlos Gómez, Anja Savcic, and Zoë Noelle Baker joined the cast in recurring roles. On July 20, 2021, Metwally was promoted as a series regular for the second season. On August 17, 2021, Janina Gavankar was cast as new series regular while Savcic was promoted as a series regular and Keitel was demoted to recurring for the second season. Two days later, Jamie-Lynn Sigler, Madelyn Kientz, Troy Johnson, Lola Reid, Jeremy Ray Taylor, T.V. Carpio, and Arturo Del Puerto joined the cast in recurring roles for the second season. On August 24, 2021, Logan Marshall-Green was cast a new series regular for the second season. On August 26, 2021, Lynch confirmed that he is set to return in some capacity for the second season. On September 21, 2021, Vinny Chhibber, Romy Rosemont, Ryan O'Nan, Michael Malarkey, and David Meunier joined the cast in recurring roles for the second season. in February 2022, Constance Zimmer and Bernard White were cast in recurring roles for the second season. On May 12, 2022, it was reported that Jensen Ackles is set to guest star for the second-season finale. The next day, it was announced that Ackles and Sigler had been promoted to series regulars for the third season. A few days later, Reba McEntire was cast a series regular for the third season. On July 18, 2022, it was announced that J. Anthony Pena was promoted to a series regular while Luke Mitchell, Seth Gabel, Henry Ian Cusick, Anirudh Pisharody, and Madalyn Horcher were cast in recurring roles for the third season. On August 5, 2022, Rosanna Arquette joined the cast in a recurring role for the third season. The following week, Rex Linn was cast in an undisclosed capacity for the third season. On September 9, 2022, Angelique Cabral joined the cast in an undisclosed capacity for the third season. A few days later, it was announced that Metwally won't be a series regular for the third season due to a scheduling conflict, but may return for a few episodes later in the season. One week later, it was confirmed that Jesse James Keitel, Anja Savcic, Janina Gavankar, Logan Marshall-Green and Vinny Chhibber won't return for the third season. On October 5, 2022, it was announced that Lyle Lovett and Darius Rucker are set to guest star on an episode for the third season.

Filming
Filming on the series' first season began on August 27, 2020, and concluded on April 24, 2021, in Vancouver, with the outdoor, mountainous wilderness around Squamish and Fraser Valley, plus various other locations in British Columbia  with aerial shots of Helena, Montana's capital. Filming was originally set to take place in Albuquerque, New Mexico, and Las Vegas, Nevada, but the series was moved to Vancouver in July 2020, due to the COVID-19 pandemic in the United States. The series was one of many American television productions in Vancouver that briefly halted filming in late September 2020, due to delays in receiving cast and crew COVID-19 test results. On August 12, 2021, it was reported that the second season is scheduled to film in Rio Rancho, New Mexico from August 2021 through April 2022.

Release

Marketing
On September 9, 2020, ABC released the first teaser for the series.

Broadcast
The series premiered on November 17, 2020, on ABC. Big Sky airs in Canada on CTV, simulcast with ABC in the United States. In India, the series was streamed on Disney+ Hotstar along with ABC. Internationally, the series premiered on Disney+ under the dedicated streaming hub Star as an original series, on February 23, 2021, and in Latin America the series premiered on August 31, 2021, On Star+.

The second season premiered on September 30, 2021, on ABC. The third season premiered on September 21, 2022, on ABC.

Reception

Critical response
For the series, review aggregator Rotten Tomatoes reported an approval rating of 61% based on 28 critic reviews, with an average rating of 6/10. The website's critics consensus reads, "Big Sky shaky setup doesn't do it many favors, but viewers who can push through may find its fast-paced, twisty mystery compelling enough." Metacritic gave the series a weighted average score of 54 out of 100 based on 18 critic reviews, indicating "mixed or average reviews".

Ratings

Overall

Season 1

Season 2

Season 3

Accolades

Controversy
After the pilot aired, members of the Rocky Mountain Tribal Leaders Council, Coushatta Tribe of Louisiana, Global Indigenous Council, Great Plains Tribal Chairmen's Association, and the Union of British Columbia Indian Chiefs (UBCIC), among others, addressed a letter to ABC Entertainment President Karey Burke and series creator David E. Kelley, accusing the show of "at best, cultural insensitivity, and at worst, appropriation" due to being set in area with a disproportionately high rate of Murdered and Missing Indigenous Women & Girls (MMIWG), yet not having any tribal representation in the show."

Notes

References

External links
 
 

2020 American television series debuts
2020s American crime drama television series
2020s American police procedural television series
2020s American mystery television series
American Broadcasting Company original programming
American thriller television series
English-language television shows
Kidnapping in television
Serial drama television series
Television productions suspended due to the COVID-19 pandemic
Television series about dysfunctional families
Television series by 20th Century Fox Television
Television series created by David E. Kelley
Television shows filmed in British Columbia
Television shows based on American novels
Television shows set in Montana
Television shows filmed in New Mexico